Daphniphyllum is the sole genus in the flowering plant family Daphniphyllaceae and was described as a genus in 1826. The genus includes evergreen shrubs and trees mainly native to east and southeast Asia, but also found in the Indian Subcontinent and New Guinea.

All species in the family are dioecious, that is male and female flowers are borne on different plants. In older classifications the genus was treated in the family Euphorbiaceae.

Daphniphyllum species are eaten by the larvae of some Lepidoptera species including the engrailed (Ectropis sp.).

Accepted species

 Synonyms
 Daphniphyllum humile Maxim. ex Franch. & Sav. (Daphniphyllum macropodum)

References

Bibliography

 
 Ohwi, J. Flora of Japan, 1984. 
 Woody Plants of Japan, Vol. 2, 2000. 

 
Saxifragales genera
Dioecious plants